Nonconformity or nonconformism may refer to:

Culture and society 
 Insubordination, the act of willfully disobeying an order of one's superior
Dissent, a sentiment or philosophy of non-agreement or opposition to a prevailing idea or entity
 Organizational dissent, the expression of disagreement or contradictory opinions about organizational practices and policies
Dissenter, one who disagrees in matters of opinion, belief, etc.
Counterculture, a subculture whose values and norms of behavior differ substantially from those of mainstream society, often in direct opposition
Bohemianism, the practice of an unconventional lifestyle, often in the company of like-minded people and with few permanent ties
Non-conformists of the 1930s, an avantgarde movement during the inter-war period in France
Counterculture of the 1960s
 Civil disobedience, the active, professed refusal of a citizen to comply with certain laws, demands, or commands of a government

Christianity 
Nonconformist (Protestantism), the state of Protestants in England and Wales who do not adhere to the Church of England
Nonconformity to the world, a Christian principle important especially among Anabaptist groups

Other 
Nonconformity (quality), a term in quality management
A type of unconformity in geology
Nonconformity (Nelson Algren book), a 1950s essay published in 1996